Aaron Ryder is a prolific and Academy Award nominated feature film producer. Early in his career, he was a key creative element of  Christopher Nolan's Memento (2000) and The Prestige (2006), and cult classic Donnie Darko (2001). As one of the founding members of FilmNation Entertainment, Ryder contributed greatly to the company’s creative direction and enduring success. During his time at FilmNation, he produced hits such as Mud (2012), House at the End of the Street (2012), The Founder (2016), Pieces of a Woman (2020), and The Map of Tiny Perfect Things (2021). In 2016, Ryder produced Denis Villeneuve's Arrival, which earned him an Academy Award for Best Picture nomination with Shawn Levy, Dan Levine, and David Linde. In early 2021, Ryder formed Ryder Picture Company a film and television production company with a first look deal with MGM aiming to continue Ryder’s success of producing movies that are equally weighted in both art and commerce while also supporting world-class filmmakers. Ryder's first production under the Ryder Picture Company banner, Bruiser (2022), premiered at the Toronto International Film Festival 2022, and the second feature, Dumb Money, is currently in production.

Filmography

Miscellaneous crew

Awards and nominations 
 Academy Award for Best Picture  Arrival  Nominated
 BAFTA Award for Best Film  Arrival  Nominated
 Producers Guild of America Award for Best Theatrical Motion Picture  Arrival  Nominated

References

External links
 

Living people
Film producers from Texas
People from Dallas
Businesspeople from Texas
Year of birth missing (living people)